Bine can mean any of the following:

 Bine (botany), a category of climbing plants which support themselves by the shoots growing in a helix around a support
 Bine language, a Papuan language of Papua New Guinea
 Binə, Baku, a settlement in Baku, Azerbaijan
 Jēkabs Bīne (1895–1955), Latvian artist
 Binə, Khojavend, a village in Khojavend Rayon, Azerbaijan
 Bine Rogelj (born 1929), Yugoslavian ski jumper
 National Identity Bloc in Europe, Romanian electoral alliance abbreviated as BINE

See also
 Haybine, a farm implement